Tobatí is a city in Tobatí District in the Cordillera Department, Paraguay.  The population of the city is 9,688.

History 
Tobati was founded in June 1539 by Domingo Martínez de Irala.  There are various opinions as to the meaning of the town's name.  One is from the Spanish definition of the word, referring to the rocky terrain, consisting largely of limestone.  Another is that it is the combination of the Guaraní language words "tova," meaning "face" and "tí," meaning "nose," or together - "nose on the face."  The third option is that the name is a combination of the Guaraní words, tova, and morotí - referring to an indigenous legend of a white faced warrior priest who would come to lead the tribes into a glorius era.

One of the greatest heroes in Paraguayan history, the "Liberator of Paraguay," Captain Pedro Juan Caballero hailed from Aparypy, Tobati.  Captain Caballero was the leader of the Paraguayan War for Independence from Spain, and is known as a very able military tactician.  Caballero continued to serve his country after the War for Independence as one of the members of the governing Junta of Paraguay until the ascension of the "Perpetual Dictator," Doctor José Gaspar Rodríguez de Francia. 

Tobati was the subject of two very well known and respected sociological studies and books. The first is titled, Tobati: A Paraguayan Town, by Helen and Elman Service.  The second is titled Tobati : tradicion y cambio en un pueblo paraguayo, by Diego Hay.

Religion 
As with most Paraguayan towns, Tobatí is predominately Roman Catholic.  There are small Evangelical, Baptist, and Jehovah’s Witnesses communities present in the town as well.  The town is divided into Barrios, generally named after Saints, and feast days of the Saints are celebrated in their respective Barrios as neighborhood events.  The religious life of the town centers around the feast day of Mary of the Immaculate Conception, the Patron Saint of Tobatí, on December 8.

The church in Tobatí contains the holy relic carving of the Virgin Mary of Immaculate Conception, which was carved by an indigenous convert to Christianity hundreds of years ago.  This Indian was pursued by his tribe to be put to death for his conversion to Christianity.  As he hid behind a tree the Indian prayed to the Holy Mother for protection in turn for his devotion and promise to create an icon to glorify her.  The tribe passed him by unnoticed and he subsequently carved two statues of the Holy Virgin.  One resides in the church in Tobati, and the other in the Basilica in neighboring Caacupe.

Culture and artwork 
Tobatí is renowned throughout Paraguay for the woodworking, ceramics, and sculptures of its artisans.  One artisan in particular, Don Zenón Páez is world-renowned.

Economy 
The major industry and income source for Tobatí is the production of building materials.  The majority of roofing tile and bricks supplying Paraguay have their origin in the many factories in Tobati.  Additionally, much of the Tobateño production is exported to neighboring Argentina and Brazil.  While some factories are modernized and run off electric machines and kilns, and some employ a mixture of modern and traditional methods, the vast majority are traditional operations.  First, the clay for the products is milled in wooden churns powered by horses or mules walking in circles around the mill.  Workers then form the tiles and bricks in hand molds and place them in the sun to dry.  In the final step the products are cooked in wood fired kilns for 24 hours or more.

Team Tobati 
Each year, a community service trip consisting of approximately 100 students from the Kingswood Oxford School in West Hartford, Connecticut travel down to Tobatí.  The group originated due to the organization of one instructor at the school, Ron Garcia, whose family is from Tobatí and who still has many family members in the town.  Team Tobati sends a large group of students and health care professionals each year over spring break to Tobatí, Paraguay on a public service trip to work with rural villages in providing access to health care and education.  The group also sends smaller contingents of students and medical professionals at various times during the year.  Additionally, Team Tobati has funded an artisan village and an educational institute, which are maintained year-round.

References 

Tobatí District